The Historic Railroad District is located in Ottumwa, Iowa, United States.  The historic district includes four separate properties: the Burlington Veterans Clubhouse (1935), the Burlington Depot (1951), the Burlington Northern/Santa Fe passenger canopies (1951) and Ballingall Park (1951).   It was listed on the National Register of Historic Places in 2011.

References

Historic districts on the National Register of Historic Places in Iowa
Historic districts in Wapello County, Iowa
National Register of Historic Places in Wapello County, Iowa
Railway stations on the National Register of Historic Places in Iowa
Buildings and structures in Ottumwa, Iowa
Transportation buildings and structures in Wapello County, Iowa